The Religious Research Association (RRA) is an association of researchers and religious professionals.

It was created in 1951 as the Religious Research Fellowship, although it existed informally as far back as the 1920s as a partnership between the Institute of Social and Religious Research and the Federal Council of Churches. Since 1958, it has held an annual lecture series in the name of H. Paul Douglass. Since the 1970s, it has met annually with the Society for the Scientific Study of Religion.

It publishes the Review of Religious Research four times a year (September, December, March, and June). It contains articles, book reviews and reports on research projects.

Presidents

 1959–1961: Lauris B. Whitman
 1962–1964: Walter Kloetzli
 1965–1966: Paul Mundy
 1967–1970: George W. Kaslow Jr.
 1971–1973: Thomas M. Gannon
 1974–1975: Earl D. C. Brewer
 1976–1977: Ross P. Scherer
 1978–1979: Barbara J. W. Hargrove
 1980: Dean R. Hoge
 1981: G. Douglass Lewis
 1982: David O. Moberg
 1983: Jackson W. Carroll
 1984: William McKinney
 1984–1986: Constant H. Jacquet
 1986–1988: Hart M. Nelsen
 1988–1990: James D. Davidson Jr.
 1990–1992: Wade Clark Roof
 1992–1994: Peggy L. Shriver
 1994–1996: Benton Johnson
 1996–1998: Carl S. Dudley
 1998–2000: Edward C. Lehman Jr.
 2000–2002: Doyle Paul Johnson
 2002–2004: Nancy Nason-Clark
 2004–2006: Daniel V. A. Olson
 2006–2008: C. Kirk Hadaway
 2008–2010: Keith Wulff
 2010–2012: John P. Bartkowski
 2012–2014: Joy Charlton
 2014–2016: Jack Marcum
 2016–2018: Scott Thumma
 ?–present: Patricia Wittberg

See also

 American Academy of Religion
 Association for the Sociology of Religion

References

External links
 

1951 establishments in the United States
Learned societies of the United States
Organizations established in 1951
Religious studies